Lazy Bear Games is a video game development company based in Vilnius, Lithuania, founded by Russian video game developers Nikita Kulaga and Svyatoslav Cherkasov in St.Petersburg, Russia. The company frequently collaborates with tinyBuild and Uroboros Games.

History 
Lazy Bear Games was founded as GameJam (Or "Game Jam Studio") in 2010 and produced games under that name from 2010 till the studio was renamed Lazy Bear Games in April 2015. Although, their first three games developed in 2010 to 2012 were either cancelled or transferred to another company. They co-developed the story-driven city builder Fairy Kingdom HD for mobile platforms with the company Game Garden in 2012-2013.
In 2013, they entered a "Next Castle Party 2013" contest where they worked on an arcade 2D MOBA/platformer called Rabbit Must Die for one week, and won two awards in two categories - best eSports game and audience award. It ran on the Web browser plugin, Unity Web Player.
They were working on a management sim with a fighter/brawler theme and mechanism called VHS Story in 2014. However, it was only available in an alpha, online version at GameJolt. Then when they were renamed to "Lazy Bear Games", they also renamed the game VHS Story to Punch Club while continuing work on it and released it later in 2016.

Games

Releases under "GameJam" label

Releases as Lazy Bear Games

References

External links 

 

Video game development companies
Video game companies of Russia